The Arcflash Labs EMG-01 is a hand-held automatic 8-stage coilgun designed and manufactured by Arcflash Labs in Los Angeles, California. It was the first handheld coilgun commercialized and sold as a fully assembled system.

Operating mechanism 

The EMG-01 uses a six-cell 25.2 volt lithium-ion polymer battery to supply up to 2000 watts of power to ten electrolytic capacitors. Unlike many coilguns, the EMG-01 operates at low voltage and does not use an inverter or capacitor charging system, which allows the system to charge in under 1/10th of a second. The ten aforementioned capacitors are used to power eight electromagnetic coils in the configuration of a linear motor to accelerate a ferromagnetic or conducting projectile to 45 m/s. Rather then fully discharging each capacitor into a single respective coil, the system uses a series of IGBTs to discharge a small portion of the total bank's energy into each coil. This system design is in contrast to many hobbyist coilguns which require several seconds or even minutes to charge a single shot, and enables the EMG-01 to fire at rates of up to 480 rounds/min.

Alpha Model 
The EMG-01A (Alpha model) was offered for sale from July 2018 to October 2018. It was sold for $950 to pre-order customers and was only produced in a small batch production run of 10 units.

Beta Model 
The EMG-01B (Beta model) was developed as a more manufacturable iteration of the base EMG-01 design. It was first offered for sale in 2020 and is still being sold as of 2022.

References 

Firearms of the United States
Products introduced in 2018